Medveditsa may refer to:

Medveditsa (Volga), a river in northwestern Russia
Medveditsa (Don), a river in southwestern Russia

See also 
 Medved (disambiguation)